Ohio Police and Fire Memorial Park is a memorial and park commemorating Ohio's police officers and firefighters, in Downtown Columbus, Ohio, United States. The park is north of Town St. just east of Third St. It features a sculpture by Ronald Dewey, engraved bricks, pavers, and benches.

Sculpture
The Ohio Police and Firefighter Memorial features bronze sculptures of a fireman and firefighter with their hands on a child's back.

See also

 Columbus Firefighters Memorial
 Columbus Police Memorial

References

External links
 

Bronze sculptures in Ohio
Downtown Columbus, Ohio
Law enforcement museums in the United States
Monuments and memorials in Ohio
Outdoor sculptures in Columbus, Ohio
Parks in Columbus, Ohio
Sculptures of children in the United States
Sculptures of men in Ohio
Statues in Columbus, Ohio